Right of Way is a 1983 American made-for-television drama film written by Richard Lees and starring Bette Davis and James Stewart, and directed by George Schaefer. The film was originally broadcast on HBO on November 21, 1983.

The film stars film veterans Davis and Stewart as an elderly long-married couple who must decide how to deal with the situation of one of them being diagnosed with a terminal illness.  Melinda Dillon and Priscilla Morrill also star.

External links

1983 television films
1983 films
1983 drama films
Films about old age
American films based on plays
Films directed by George Schaefer
HBO Films films
Films scored by Brad Fiedel
American drama television films
1980s American films